Music from and Inspired by Mission: Impossible 2 is the soundtrack album for the 2000 film Mission: Impossible 2. It was certified gold for 100,000 copies shipped in Japan in August 2000.

Track listing 

Many versions of the soundtrack include additional songs that are not available on the North American releases. For example:
 The UK version includes the song "Iko-Iko" from Zap Mama.
 The Japan version includes 2 extra songs: "S.O.S" by Oblivion Dust and "Iko-Iko" from Zap Mama.
 The Australia version includes 3 extra songs: 17) Zap Mama – "Iko Iko"; 18) 28 Days – "Sucker"; 19) Josh Abrahams – "Theme From Mission Impossible".
 The Latin American version includes 2 extra songs, including "Deslizándote" by Saúl Hernández.
 The Brazilian version includes 1 extra song: "Give my Bullet Back" by Raimundos.
 The Asian version includes 2 extra songs: "Iko-Iko" by Zap Mama and "Afraid of What?" by Leon Lai, which contains a mixture of English and Mandarin.

Court case 
The illegal online availability of a demo of the song "I Disappear" prior to the release of the soundtrack led to the 2000 U.S. district court case Metallica v. Napster, Inc.

Charts

Weekly charts

Year-end charts

Certifications and sales

References 

2000 soundtrack albums
Mission: Impossible music
Hollywood Records soundtracks
Hans Zimmer soundtracks
Mission: Impossible (film series)